My Bloody Valentine may refer to:

Music
My Bloody Valentine (band), an alternative rock band. 
M b v (album), a 2013 album by My Bloody Valentine
 "My Bloody Valentine", a song by Good Charlotte from the 2002 album The Young and the Hopeless
 "My Bloody Valentine", a song by Tata Young from the 2009 album Ready for Love

Film and television
My Bloody Valentine (film), a Canadian slasher film released in 1981
My Bloody Valentine 3D, a 2009 remake of the film, shot in 3D
 "My Bloody Valentine" (Supernatural), an episode of the television series Supernatural

See also
Bloody Valentine (disambiguation)
MBV (disambiguation)